Daniel Freeman  is a British psychologist and paranoia expert at the Institute of Psychiatry, Psychology and Neuroscience at King's College London and professor of clinical psychology and National Institute for Health Research research professor in the Department of Psychiatry at University of Oxford. His research indicates that paranoia affects a much wider population, not just those who have schizophrenia, as previously thought. One of his studies has also suggested that virtual reality can help treat paranoia. He has written several books on paranoia and anxiety disorders.

In 2008, Freeman received the May Davidson Award from the British Psychological Society's Division of Clinical Psychology. On 22 July 2022, he was elected a Fellow of the British Academy (FBA), the United Kingdom's national academy for the humanities and social sciences.

In December 2018 Freeman presented the BBC Radio 4 series A History of Delusions.

References

External links
 Daniel Freeman on the website of the Oxford Department of Psychiatry

Year of birth missing (living people)
Living people
English psychologists
NIHR Research Professors
NIHR Senior Investigators
Academics of King's College London
Fellows of the British Psychological Society
Fellows of University College, Oxford
Fellows of the British Academy